Apo or Apong  is an alcohol drink commonly found among the tribes in the Northeast India states of Arunachal Pradesh and Assam. It is prepared by fermentation of rice. It is known by various names across different tribes in Arunachal Pradesh and Assam.

The Nyishi people, who form the national part of the local tribal population in Arunachal Pradesh, celebrate Nyokum annually. They serve the local drink, apo. The Nyishi people offer the drink, every time they drink it, to the spirits (wiyu) by letting few drops of it fall on the ground. Other occasions when Apo is served include annually organized ancestor worship ceremonies, the festivals of Bihu, Nyokum, Dree, and others, and annual agricultural programs like ‘No-Khua and No Bhiri’ .

Apo is known in different names across different tribes in North-Eastern India, such as Haaz (Ahom), Apong (Mising), and Zou (zu mai) (Bodo). Apo is not distributed in shops, as Apo forms part of a tradition and culture, the Apo is shared through generations like a piece of cultural knowledge. Apos are commonly brewed in households and often served along with rice and chutney as well, irrespective of gender or age differences.

History 
The origins of the Apo tradition in the North-Eastern regions are not recorded, However, the tradition may date back to neolithic period. Similarly, the word Apo is not a general term for a rice-based drink, as each tribe identifies the drink with different names. However, it is believed that the traditional rice beer was first developed by the ‘Mising people in Assam. Thus the etymology of the word refers to its Assmaese origins. Across the different tribes, the brewing method has certain differences, but the substrates used for fermentation are the same. This indicates a common ancestor to the brewing culture in North-Eastern India. Traditionally, two kinds of Apo are being brewed in these regions known as Apong Nogin and Po:ro. 

The starter cakes called E’pob a made out of crushed rice and medicinal plants are used to make the health quotient.  These starter cakes are one of the most important elements of the rice beers made in the North-Eastern region, including Apo. This also refers to the idea of sacredness associated with the Apo making across different tribes as it is not made on an everyday basis, but only for ceremonies, festivals, marriage, and group gatherings. In this regard, historically and culturally, the Apo remains as an element of identity in these regions.

Apo and the Mising people 

Apo is known in different traditional names based on the respective tribes. Apo is believed to be first developed by the Mising people in Assam. The term Apo is derived from the traditional name of Apong beer in the Mising language. The Mising community is generally known for its passion for traditional cooking methods and food items, along with their indigenous knowledge of folklore medicines that have been shared through generations of the Mishing tribes. The cooking method of the Apong beer is also believed to be shared by the ancestors of Mising immunity and later spread throughout the tribes in North East India.

Production 
Apo is commonly produced in households of northeastern states of Arunachal Pradesh and Assam in India. Although distinctive methods for brewing exist across the North-Eastern region of India, the process of fermentation remains the same across these regions, inidicating common origins of brewing. 

As a first step, the rice collected for making beverage is cooked and then mixed with ash from burnt paddy sticks, which makes the mixture black in color. Once the rice is cooked, it is mixed with the fermenting ingredient E-Pob made out of rice and medicinal plants. Time is taken for the formation of ration changes along with the climate and temperature. During the summer season, the fermentation took 5–6 days. The fermented mixture is filtered and finally poured into bamboo shoots. During these processes, around 30 medicinal plants use to the beverage along with rice.  This includes leaves, creepers, and grass. The total period taken for the production of Apo beer is more than 3 months. Although the alcohol content on the Apo is 18-25% it is more intoxicating in nature. 

Recent studies indicate the Apo Beer can be economically benefiting the community as the beer provides the entrepreneurial potential to the community as the rice beer produced in Northeast regions, including Apo are high quality in nature.

The Apop Pitha (starter cake) 
The starter cake is one of the most indispensable elements of the Apo beer production process. The Apo beer produced by the Mising community is identified to have various medicinal and therapeutic properties as a result often used during the preparation of starter cake known as 'apop pitha'.  The beer-making process in each tribe varies according to the environmental factors and other socio-cultural practices associated with the individual tribes. These factors are essential in determining the color, flavour, and sweetness of the flower.  One major process during the production of Apong is the use of starter cake, i.e. apop pitha which has significant medicinal qualities. This quality is of starter cake is determined by the medicinal plants used during the production along with the sanitary conditions used while making the beer.  The making of apo pitha in this regard include the process of collecting a variety of medicinal plant leaves. The leaves collected are dried placing it on a bamboo mat known as 'opoh' after cleaning it.  Fresh leaves can also be used for making the starter cake for making the beer.  The leaves are later ground separately using a wooden tools hand mixer together to make a apop pitha in the shape of oval-shaped balls from the dough made from the mixture.  Kuhiar (Saccharum officinarum), senikuthi (Scoparia dulcis), bhilongoni (Cyclosorus exlensa), anaras (pineapple, also known as Ananas comosus), bam kolmou (Ipomoea species), kopou dhekia, lexuosum Lygodium flexuosum,  lai jabori (Drymaria cordata), horumanimuni (Hydrocotyle sibthorpioides jalokia (Capsicum annuum), dhapat tita (Clerodendrum viscosum), bormanimuni (Centella asiatica) etc. are some of the most basic medicinal plants and herbs used for the making of ‘apo pitha’.

Folk medicine 
The folk medicine beliefs of the starter cake derive from the use of local herbs.  Tribes believe that the combination of herbs makes Apo beer an effective agent against various minor diseases.  Most of the plants used for the preparation of the beer are indigenous. The varieties of Apo beer in the northeast region of India include methods of infusion and decoction used by the local peoples.

Culture 
Apo is an important element in the socio-cultural aspect of the Mising people. The Apo beer is served during all religious festivals and ceremonies in Assam such as Midong, Fishing, Dabur, Bihu, and Ali Aye Ligang (Ali Ai Ligang). The Ali Aye Ligang is a spring festival celebrated by the Mising community during the first Wednesday of the Assamese month named 'Fagun (Fagun Thakrar)'. This festival celebrating the beginning of the paddy cultivation in Assam traditionally uses Apong as a mandatory dish for the celebration. Apong is served along with pork 'purang apin, boiled rice wrap in leaves 'tupula that'. The Apong is also offered to the deities and spirits to appease them.

Local economy 
In local markets, Apo beer is a source of income and livelihood for many families, and contributes to community development.

See also
 List of rice beverages
 Rice wine

References

External links
 The Rice Beers of the Mishing People
 Mising Rice Beer(Apong- Apop Part 1)
 Mising Rice Beer Recipe|Part 2
Making the Mising Brew in Majuli

Indian alcoholic drinks
Apo
Fermented drinks
Assamese cuisine
Culture of Arunachal Pradesh
Types of beer
Traditional Indian alcoholic beverages